Mesakin is an ethnic group in the Nuba Hills in Sudan. The population of this minority possibly exceeds 50,000. They speak Ngile and Dengebu, Niger–Congo languages close enough to be considered dialects.

References
Joshua Project

Nuba peoples
Ethnic groups in Sudan